The domain name rio is a top-level domain (TLD) for Rio de Janeiro in the Domain Name System of the Internet. On 27 February 2014, ICANN and Empresa Municipal de Informática SA – IPLANRIO entered into a Registry Agreement under which Empresa Municipal de Informática SA – IPLANRIO operates the  TLD. It was officially launched in 2015.

See also
.br

References

External links

IANA  whois information
 whois

Computer-related introductions in 2014
Internet in Brazil
Top-level domains